Sir George Richard Frederick Tottenham  (18 November 1890 – 11 January 1977) was an Irish-born civil servant in India and a first-class cricketer.

The son of Frederick St. Leger Tottenham (who was the High Sheriff of Clare in 1899) and his wife Mabel Caroline Garnier, Tottenham was born at Mount Callan near Inagh, County Clare in November 1890. He was educated in England at Harrow School, before going up to New College, Oxford. After graduating from New College, Tottenham began working for the Indian Civil Service in British India, taking up a post there in 1914. The following year, he made an appearance in first-class cricket for the Europeans against the Indians at Madras. Batting once in the match, he scored 21 runs in the Europeans first-innings, before being dismissed by T. Vasu. With the ball, he took one wicket in the Indians first-innings and two in their second-innings. He married Hazel Joyce Gwynne in 1917. 

Tottenham continued to serve in the British civil service in India following Irish independence, and was awarded a Knighthood by George V in May 1930. He was made a companion to the Order of the Indian Empire in the 1936 New Year Honours, and was made a Knight Bachelor in May 1937. He continued to serve in the Indian Civil Service on special duty following Indian Independence in 1947. He spent his final years living in Totland on the Isle of Wight, where he died in January 1977.

References

External links

1890 births
1977 deaths
People from County Clare
People educated at Harrow School
Alumni of New College, Oxford
Irish civil servants
Irish cricketers
Europeans cricketers
Knights Bachelor
Companions of the Order of the Star of India
Knights Commander of the Order of the Indian Empire
Indian Civil Service (British India) officers
British people in colonial India